"I nat" is a song by Danish electro, dance and house duo Svenstrup & Vendelboe, featuring vocals from Karen. It was released in Denmark as a digital download on 24 May 2010. The song peaked at number 12 on the Danish Singles Chart.

Music video 
A music video to accompany the release of "I nat" was first released onto YouTube on 21 October 2010 at a total length of three minutes and forty-nine seconds. As of April 2016 it has received over 700,000 views.

Track listing

Chart performance

Release history

References 

2010 singles
2010 songs
Svenstrup & Vendelboe songs